Stephanie Winston Wolkoff (née Batinkoff) is an American fashion and entertainment executive and former senior advisor to the first lady Melania Trump. Before her controversial role in politics, she produced various notable events in New York City, including the Met Gala, and later worked as the founding fashion director for Lincoln Center and facilitated the expansion of its Mercedes-Benz Fashion Week.

Early life
Wolkoff was born to parents Barbara (née Carnel) and Barry Batinkoff and raised in the Catskills. Her family is Jewish.  Wolkoff is the sister of actor Randall Batinkoff.  She attended Fordham University, where she played NCAA Division I basketball as a power forward for two years. She then transferred to Loyola University New Orleans where she graduated with a degree in communications.

Career
Her first job was as a lobbyist for Sotheby's, and she later worked as an assistant to New York concert promoter Ron Delsener. In 1996, Wolkoff started working for Vogue magazine as a public relations manager, where she helped organize events such as the VH1 Fashion Awards and the Met Gala. After briefly resigning in 2010, she was rehired by Anna Wintour, who installed Wolkoff as fashion director for New York Fashion Week. She met Melania Knauss, then Donald Trump's girlfriend, in 2003 while working for Vogue, and the two became friends. She attended the Trump wedding and Melania's baby shower, and they lunched together regularly. She says Melania was like "the sister I never had before".

Role in the Trump administration
In 2016, Wolkoff created an event planning firm, WIS Media Partners, which was instrumental in organizing the Inauguration of Donald Trump in January 2017. Wolkoff's firm was paid $26 million for their services: about one-quarter of the total expenses of the inauguration. According to a tax filing, most of the money went to other vendors and a dozen staff members.

Early in the Trump administration, Wolkoff was named an unpaid senior advisor to first lady Melania Trump. Melania Trump cut ties with Wolkoff on February 26, 2018. Wolkoff resigned that month, after the extent of her firm's compensation for organizing the inaugural festivities was reported. She says she was "scapegoated" and that only $1.6 million of the $26 million went to her personally.

Melania and Me
In 2020, Wolkoff published a book, Melania and Me, described as a "tell-all" about her tragic experiences in the White House with Donald Trump and Melania Trump. The book contains extensive direct quotes from Melania Trump; when asked how that was possible, Wolkoff explained that after her relations with the first lady soured, she began recording conversations. The Trump Justice Department filed a civil suit against Wolkoff in October 2019, alleging breach of a nondisclosure agreement, which the Biden Justice Department dropped in February 2021.

Personal life
After her parents' divorce, she was adopted by her mother's second husband, Bruce Winston, the son of jeweler Harry Winston. Wolkoff met her husband, real estate developer David Wolkoff, in 1996 and they married in March 2000. They have three children.

Bibliography
Melania and Me (2020)

References 

1970 births
Living people
20th-century American Jews
American fashion businesspeople
American memoirists
Businesspeople from New York (state)
21st-century American businesswomen
21st-century American businesspeople
Trump administration personnel
Women government officials
Fordham University alumni
Loyola University New Orleans alumni
21st-century American Jews